Nymphodora Semenova (1787 – 1876), was a Russian opera singer.  She was engaged at the Imperial Theatres in 1807-1828, during which she had a successful career and referred to as the elite of her profession of her generation. She was the sister of Ekaterina Semenova.

References

1787 births
1876 deaths
19th-century opera singers from the Russian Empire
Burials at Tikhvin Cemetery